The Gothenburg, or simply The Goth, is a community-run pub in the former mining village of Fallin, near Stirling, Scotland.

Founded in 1910, it is one of the few remaining pubs in Scotland still run under the Gothenburg system – with at least 95% of the profits gifted to community causes. During miners' strikes the Goth hosted soup kitchens and supported miners' strike funds. It remains as a marker of the village's mining history.

The Goth has close ties to the neighbouring bowls club.

References 

Pubs in Scotland
1910 establishments in Scotland
Temperance movement